Dan W. Hester (born November 8, 1948) is a retired professional basketball center who played one season in the American Basketball Association (ABA) as a member of the Denver Rockets and the Kentucky Colonels during the 1970–71 season. He was drafted from Louisiana State University by the Atlanta Hawks during the second round of the 1970 NBA draft, but he never played for them.

References

External links

1948 births
Living people
American men's basketball players
Atlanta Hawks draft picks
Basketball players from Illinois
Centers (basketball)
Denver Rockets players
Junior college men's basketball players in the United States
Kentucky Colonels players
LSU Tigers basketball players
People from Mount Vernon, Illinois